The Battle of Torran-Roy was a Scottish clan battle that took place in the year 1570 in the county of Sutherland, Scotland. It was fought between the forces of Alexander Gordon, 12th Earl of Sutherland (chief of Clan Sutherland) and the forces of George Sinclair, 4th Earl of Caithness (chief of the Clan Sinclair). The Earl of Sutherland's force consisted primarily of the Murrays (or Morays) of Aberscross who despite their name were not part of the Clan Murray in Atholl, but who were a sept of the Clan Sutherland, and who as the principal vassals of the Earl of Sutherland, were charged with the defense of the shire. The Earl of Caithness's forces consisted primarily of followers of Alexander Sutherland, 8th of Duffus who was a descendant of the old Sutherland Earls of Sutherland who had been ousted and replaced by the Gordons as earls in the early 16th-century.

Background

In 1570 a feud arose between the Gordon Earl of Sutherland and the Earl of Caithness, chief of Clan Sinclair. Caithness was supported by his father-in-law Alexander Sutherland, 8th of Duffus, (a descendant of the old Sutherland Earls of Sutherland). Caithness made Sutherland of Duffus's brother, William Sutherland of Evelick, attack the Murrays of Aberscors (Aberscross) in vengeance, taking prisoner John Croy-Murray. Hugh Murray of Aberscors then assembled his friends and made incursions upon the lands of Evelick as well as laying waste to several villages belonging to the Sutherland Laird of Duffus and taking hostage a Sutherland gentlemen to secure the safety of John Croy-Murray. The Sutherland Laird of Duffus then gathered all of his kinsmen at Skibo Castle and proceeded to the town of Dornoch with the intention of burning it.

Skirmish of Torran-Roy and Siege of Dornoch

The Murrays went out and met the Sutherlands of Duffus in battle, overthrowing them and pursuing them back to the gates of Skibo. Prisoners were then exchanged for John Croy-Murray. This was known as the skirmish of Torran-Roy. However, on hearing of the news of the skirmish of Torran-Roy, the Earl of Caithness sent the Master of Caithness who, along with the Mackays, besieged the Murrays in Dornoch Castle and the church. The Murrays held out for a week before surrendering after which three of them were beheaded.

Aftermath

George Sinclair, 4th Earl of Caithness later imprisoned his son, the Master of Caithnes, for making peace with the Murrays. In 1590 John Morray of Aberscross was killed leading the Clan Sutherland against the Earl of Caithness at the Battle of Clynetradwell.

References

See also
Earl of Sutherland
Clan Sutherland
Earl of Caithness
Clan Sinclair
Murray of Aberscross

Torran-Roy
Torran-Roy